Julius Blackburn House, also known as Warwick, is an historic estate located in the western area of Scott County, Kentucky. The oldest section of the structure is a log cabin dating prior to 1799, with a newer stone section built by Thomas Metcalfe for Julius Blackburn in 1799. The property was added to the U.S. National Register of Historic Places on April 14, 1977.

History
American Revolutionary War veteran Sergeant Julius Blackburn originally settled in Woodford County, Kentucky at Blackburn's Fort in 1790 after serving with Gist's Virginia Brigade. In 1799, Blackburn relocated to Scott County, Kentucky with his wife Elizabeth (Betsy) Scruggs. The Blackburn's moved into a log cabin and engaged stonemason Thomas Metcalfe to construct their house with stone from Chinn River Kentucky marble quarry in Woodford, County. The older log cabin joins the newer stone section to become a structure known as the Warwick House.

D.L. Nunnelly resided at the estate from 1912 until 1951, followed by John White.

References

Houses completed in 1799
National Register of Historic Places in Scott County, Kentucky
Houses in Scott County, Kentucky
Houses on the National Register of Historic Places in Kentucky
1799 establishments in Kentucky
Log cabins in the United States
Stone houses in Kentucky
Log buildings and structures on the National Register of Historic Places in Kentucky